Ben Armour Williamson (born 7 August 2001) is a Scottish footballer, who plays as a midfielder for Dundee, on loan from Rangers.

Career
In January 2020, Williamson, a product of the Rangers youth system, signed a new contract with the club extending his stay until the summer of 2021.

On 13 January 2021, Williamson joined Arbroath in the Scottish Championship, after agreeing a one-year contract extension until 2022. Williamson made his professional debut three days later in a draw with Queen of the South.

On 12 July 2021, Williamson signed a new two-year contract with Rangers and then moved to Livingston on a season-long loan. This loan would be cut short in January 2022, and Williamson would immediately be sent on loan to Scottish Championship side Raith Rovers for the remainder of the season.

On 15 July 2022, Williamson would sign an extension with Rangers which would keep him at the club until 2024, and then joined Scottish Championship side Dundee on a season-long loan. He would make his debut for the Dark Blues in an away win over Stranraer in the Scottish League Cup. Williamson would score his first goal for Dundee in a 3–0 win over league leaders Queen's Park on 28 January 2023.

Career statistics

References

External links

2001 births
Living people
Scottish footballers
Association football midfielders
Rangers F.C. players
Arbroath F.C. players
Livingston F.C. players
Scottish Professional Football League players
Scotland under-21 international footballers
Raith Rovers F.C. players
Dundee F.C. players